Tapoides is a monotypic plant genus of the family Euphorbiaceae. The sole species is Tapoides villamilii. It is endemic to Borneo. It is dioecious, with male and female flowers on separate plants.

References

Aleuritideae
Monotypic Euphorbiaceae genera
Flora of Borneo
Dioecious plants